Ivan McIntosh (14 December 1913 – 19 April 1970) was  a former Australian rules footballer who played with Collingwood in the Victorian Football League (VFL).

Notes

External links 

		
Ivan McIntosh's profile at Collingwood Forever

1913 births
1970 deaths
Australian rules footballers from Victoria (Australia)
Collingwood Football Club players